Sleumeria is a genus of flowering plants belonging to the family Icacinaceae.

Its native range is Borneo.

Species:
 Sleumeria auriculata Utteridge, Nagam. & Teo

References

Icacinaceae
Asterid genera